is a Japanese politician of the Liberal Democratic Party, a member of the House of Representatives in the Diet (national legislature). A native of Izumisano, Osaka, he attended Nippon Sport Science University, Eastern Michigan University and Nihon University. He was elected to the House of Representatives for the first time in 1996 as a member of the New Frontier Party. After losing his seat in 2003, he was re-elected in 2005.

References

External links 
 Official website in Japanese.

1946 births
Living people
20th-century Japanese politicians
21st-century Japanese politicians
Eastern Michigan University alumni
[Category:Japanese male sport wrestlers]]
Japanese sportsperson-politicians
Liberal Democratic Party (Japan) politicians
Members of the House of Representatives (Japan)
Nihon University alumni
Nippon Sport Science University alumni
New Frontier Party (Japan) politicians
People from Izumisano
Wrestling coaches